Kapar is a town in Klang District, Selangor, Malaysia. The Sultan Salahuddin Abdul Aziz Power Station is located not far from town. The Kapar River which flows nearby the town centre empties into the Straits of Malacca.

Klang District
Towns in Selangor